Well is a small village and civil parish in the Hambleton District of North Yorkshire, England. It is about 4 miles south of Bedale, near Snape. Well is situated at the edge of a limestone escarpment that overlooks the Vale of Mowbray. The population recorded by the 2011 Census was 230.

History
The 'well' of Well is a spring which, along with several other springs, feeds the beck running through the village. The well lends its name to the village, described as Wella in the Domesday Book. The name Wella is Old English, literally meaning well or stream. The village used to be in the wapentake of Hang East.

The village has an old school with a schoolhouse. The Old School, originally the workhouse school, was founded in 1605 by Thomas Earl of Exeter and his wife Dorothy, daughter of John Neville.  The school was endowed with £30 a year for the maintenance of a master and mistress and 12 poor girls from Well and Snape. In 1788, it was converted into two single sex free schools, which each house in the village could send a boy and a girl between the ages of 6 and 13, with the option to pay for additional places.  The school was rebuilt in 1867 and in 1890 had space for 80 pupils. 

Built in 1722, the Old School House is Grade II listed principally owing to its 18th century roof structure, inglenook fireplace, and having been built by the same charitable trust. Today, they are both owned by "The Neville Trust", a charity named after an influential family from the Tudor period. In addition, there is a small playing field with two swings and a small football pitch. As these facilities are rarely used by the children in the village, the trust is now planning to sell all assets.

The village still has four almshouses called "St Michael's Cottages" with their own chapel. There is a family-run pub called The Milbank Arms, which serves food and drinks.

There is a Methodist Chapel, which holds regular services, and a village institute, which is used for children's parties, coffee mornings and other events. Every August, the village hosts a scarecrow trail in which many of the houses in the village create a scarecrow and give it a name; each house then has a number, and members of the community have to work out which name belongs to which scarecrow. The winner receives a cash prize. The competition usually runs from mid-August to early September.

The village also has a number of walks, with views across the area; on a clear day, Roseberry Topping is visible.

The church
The Church of St Michael the Archangel is a Grade I listed, 12th century structure. A place of worship was noted in the Domesday Book, but the present structure dates from the 12th and 14th centuries, being built by Sir Ralph Neville. The church contains a portion of Roman mosaic found in 1859.

References

External links

Well Village Website Contains information on the village and history.
Masham Parishes website

Villages in North Yorkshire
Civil parishes in North Yorkshire